Gloria Rosa (born 4 February 1958) is a Puerto Rican archer. She competed in the women's individual event at the 1988 Summer Olympics.

References

External links
 

1958 births
Living people
Puerto Rican female archers
Olympic archers of Puerto Rico
Archers at the 1988 Summer Olympics
Place of birth missing (living people)